Matana Buzurg railway station (station code: MABG) is an abandoned railway station of Ujjain, Madhya Pradesh. It is operated by Western Railway which lies on Ujjain–Dewas–Indore track. The station consist of two platforms. The platforms are not well sheltered. It lacks many facilities including water and sanitation.

References

Railway stations in Ujjain district
Ratlam railway division
Buildings and structures in Ujjain
Transport in Ujjain
Railway stations in Ujjain
Year of establishment missing